Marc Evers (born 17 July 1991) is a Dutch Paralympic swimmer. He swims in S14 and SB14 classification events, specializing in both backstroke and breaststroke competitions. He is a Paralympic, World and European champion in the 100m breaststroke.

Personal history
Evers was born in Hillegom, Netherlands in 1991. He has autism.

Swimming career
Evers learnt to swim at the age of four. At the age of twelve he began competitive swimming and won several national youth titles. Initially he found it difficult to find a swimming club that would coach him due to his intellectual disability. Eventually he joined ZV Haerlem,  where he met trainer Wim Ten Wolde. In 2007 Evers was selected for the Netherlands national swimming team.

In December 2011, at the Open Dutch Championships in Eindhoven, he qualified for the 2012 Summer Paralympics in London. At London, on 31 August, he won the gold medal in the 100m backstroke setting a world record time. Six days later he took the bronze medal in the 100m breaststroke. When Evers took the gold in the backstroke he became the first athlete with an intellectual disability to win a medal since Sydney 2000.

References

External links
Marc Evers' official site

1991 births
Living people
Dutch male freestyle swimmers
Dutch male backstroke swimmers
Dutch male breaststroke swimmers
Dutch male medley swimmers
S14-classified Paralympic swimmers
Paralympic swimmers of the Netherlands
Paralympic gold medalists for the Netherlands
Paralympic bronze medalists for the Netherlands
Paralympic medalists in swimming
Swimmers at the 2012 Summer Paralympics
Medalists at the 2012 Summer Paralympics
Medalists at the World Para Swimming Championships
Medalists at the World Para Swimming European Championships
People from Hillegom
Sportspeople with autism
Sportspeople from South Holland
21st-century Dutch people